Fraser is a city in Dodge Township, Boone County, Iowa. The population was 101 at the time of the 2020 census. It is part of the Boone, Iowa Micropolitan Statistical Area, which is a part of the larger Ames–Boone Combined Statistical Area. The city is located along the Des Moines River.

History
Fraser was platted in 1893 by the Fraser Coal Company. Within a couple of decades, the coal mines were exhausted.

The Boone and Scenic Valley Railroad runs through the town.

Geography
Fraser is located at  (42.124335, -93.969278).

Demographics

2010 census
At the 2010 census there were 102 people in 43 households, including 29 families, in the city. The racial makup of the city was 98.0% White and 2.0% from two or more races.

Of the 43 households 23.3% had children under the age of 18 living with them, 51.2% were married couples living together, 7.0% had a female householder with no husband present, 9.3% had a male householder with no wife present, and 32.6% were non-families. 23.3% of households were one person and 7% were one person aged 65 or older. The average household size was 2.37 and the average family size was 2.79.

The median age was 45 years. 18.6% of residents were under the age of 18; 8.9% were between the ages of 18 and 24; 22.6% were from 25 to 44; 37.2% were from 45 to 64; and 12.7% were 65 or older. The gender makeup of the city was 51.0% male and 49.0% female.

2000 census
At the 2000 census there were 137 people in 49 households, including 34 families, in the city. The racial makup of the city was 96.35% White, 2.19% Native American, 0.73% from other races, and 0.73% from two or more races. Hispanic or Latino of any race were 1.46%.

Of the 49 households 42.9% had children under the age of 18 living with them, 65.3% were married couples living together, 6.1% had a female householder with no husband present, and 28.6% were non-families. 20.4% of households were one person and 2.0% were one person aged 65 or older. The average household size was 2.80 and the average family size was 3.31.

The age distribution was 24.8% under the age of 18, 12.4% from 18 to 24, 29.9% from 25 to 44, 24.1% from 45 to 64, and 8.8% 65 or older. The median age was 38 years. For every 100 females, there were 110.8 males. For every 100 females age 18 and over, there were 110.2 males.

The median household income was $40,313 and the median family income was $46,250. Males had a median income of $30,000 versus $20,536 for females. The per capita income for the city was $14,454. There were 2.8% of families and 5.1% of the population living below the poverty line, including 6.3% of under eighteens and none of those over 64.

Education
Fraser is a part of the Southeast Webster-Grand Community School District, established on July 1, 2005 by the merger of the Grand Community School District and the Southeast Webster Community School District.

References

Cities in Boone County, Iowa
Cities in Iowa
1893 establishments in Iowa